Doctors is a British medical soap opera which began broadcasting on BBC One on 26 March 2000. Set in the fictional West Midlands town of Letherbridge, the soap follows the lives of the staff and patients of the Mill Health Centre, a fictional NHS doctor's surgery, as well as its sister surgery located at a nearby university campus. The following is a list of characters that first appeared in Doctors in 2021, by order of first appearance. All characters are introduced by the programme's executive producer, Mike Hobson. Luca McIntyre (Ross McLaren) made his debut in February as a nurse at the Mill. In March, PPG chairwoman Miranda Evans (Ruthie Henshall) began appearing. Harriet Shelton (Carley Stenson) then joined in April. Lucy Benjamin appeared in May as Jan Fisher in a standalone episode. In September, Angela Wynter joined the cast as Makeda, the mother of Bear Sylvester (Dex Lee). Kevwe Emefe made her debut as Chelle Henry, a patient of Ruhma Carter's (Bharti Patel), in December. Additionally, multiple other characters appear throughout the year.

Luca McIntyre

Luca McIntyre, portrayed by Ross McLaren, made his first appearance on 24 February 2021. He was introduced following the departure of nurse Ayesha Lee (Laura Rollins) the year prior. McLaren's acting credits confirmed that he had been contracted as a series regular on the soap and he felt thrilled to be cast on Doctors. McIntyre described Luca as a cheeky and lovely character who would "go the extra mile" to help a patient. Luca's introduction sees him feature in a standalone centric episode that explores his background, including experiencing homophobia in his former workplace and suffering a car accident that ends the life of his boyfriend Billy Parker (Daniel Cornish). His background also involves a religious upbringing and a bad relationship with his mother, and later scenes in the series reveal that Luca is HIV-positive, which he initially receives a negative response to from patients of the Mill Health Centre.

Since his introduction, Luca has developed a friendship with Emma Reid (Dido Miles), whom he later begins to live with. Jonno Parker (Tommy Sim'aan), the brother of his dead boyfriend, blackmails Luca in a storyline that eventually sees Luca helping Jonno to recover from his drug addiction. Luca's argumentative nature has also been explored, including his various disputes with surgery partners Zara Carmichael (Elisabeth Dermot Walsh) and Daniel Granger (Matthew Chambers). For his portrayal of the character, McLaren has been nominated for various awards at the National Television Awards, the Inside Soap Awards and the RTS Midlands Awards.

Miranda Evans

Miranda Evans, portrayed by Ruthie Henshall, first appeared 25 March 2021 and made her final appearance on 22 April 2021. Details surrounding the character and casting were announced on 16 March 2021, with Simon Timblick of What's on TV writing that she is "the infamous new head of the Patient Participation Group" (PPG). He confirmed that the role would be recurring. Prior to her first appearance, she is mentioned by Bear Sylvester (Dex Lee) when he discovers that she is the chairwoman of the PPG. He learns that receptionist Valerie Pitman (Sarah Moyle) has worked with Miranda, and asks for intel on her. Valerie tells Bear that Miranda is "a terrible manager and a real bully". Bear accidentally reveals this to Miranda, who he believes is somebody attending the meeting like him.

Following the meeting, Bear invites her to visit the Mill to talk about her new patient consultation scheme. When Valerie meets her, she assumes that she her personality has changed since she saw her. Valerie gives Miranda a tuna sandwich, not knowing that she is allergic to fish. Afterwards, Miranda confronts Valerie in private and insults her. Miranda suggests going for lunch with Bear, where she flirts with him. Despite Bear not returning flirtatious energy, she continues to flirt with him, and whilst at the Mill, receptionist Karen Hollins (Jan Pearson) notices Miranda checking Bear out. She leaves Bear a voicemail telling him that she enjoyed the meal, and would like to go for cocktails with him. Miranda then sends Bear a "rather risque" GIF, but insists it is a joke. After Bear tells her that he is not interested in her romantically and wants a professional relationship with her, she dismisses him. Miranda then informs Valerie that she will never see her again.

Harriet Shelton

Harriet Shelton, portrayed by Carley Stenson, first appeared on 28 April 2021 and made her final appearance on 28 September 2021. Harriet is introduced as a police sergeant at Letherbridge Police Station. Stenson began filming for the soap in February 2021, and she confirmed her casting on Instagram on 19 April 2021, where she expressed her gratitude to be appearing on Doctors. Stenson's followers expressed their excitement to see her in the soap, describing her as "the most beautiful policewoman" and stating that they will watch Doctors to see her.

Stenson said that the environment on set is "calm and welcoming" and that working with Walker is an "honour". Her friend, Ali Bastian, appeared in Doctors in 2019 as practice manager Becky Clarke. Bastian learned that Stenson would be in the soap and told her how "amazing" the cast and crew members were, which Stenson was glad to learn is true. Stenson said that since she is pregnant and due to the ongoing COVID-19 pandemic, it has been a challenge for her to find work. She described Harriet's storyline as "cracking", and noted that she was working amongst "highly experienced, impressive actors in such a positive place". Stenson confirmed that the role would be recurring, describing her experience on set as "such a fun journey" in April. In an interview with Inside Soap, Stenson stated that her character is determined and capable of performing her job well, and that she is "one of the lads". She said that viewers will see her "going from strength to strength" professionally, and that eventually, she forms a "camaraderie and trust" with Rob. She explained that Harriet has "worked her way up the ranks" to become a sergeant and is "massively determined" to succeed in the job role. Stenson also talked about the uniform she is required to wear as part of the role, stating that it hides her baby bump well. She likes wearing the police gear for the role and said that she enjoys playing a police officer, but joked that she would not be a good police officer in real life.

When she arrives at Letherbridge Police Station, Rob Hollins (Chris Walker) "doesn’t exactly give Harriet a warm welcome". Rob is unhappy about having to mentor Harriet, but they are thrown into working together when they are put on a case with each other. Since they do not initially get along, Harriet makes an effort to know Rob. She learns about Rob and wife Karen Hollins' (Jan Pearson) foster work, and when they get along, Rob invites her to a quiz night. Whilst on a crime scene, Rob pauses and Harriet is forced to cover for him; she asks why he blanked and he claims that it was a moment of old age. Rob later opens up to Harret, explaining that he suffers from post-traumatic stress disorder due to a traumatic event at work years ago. Harriet lends her support to Rob, stating she will always be there for him. When Harriet and Rob are chasing criminals Aaron Jeffries (Zak Douglas) and Lenny Calhoun (Nicholas Chambers), Harriet finds Rob standing over the body of Aaron, who is laying lifeless at the bottom of a staircase. She questions a clueless Rob on what happened and rushes to help Aaron. After Marvin
Bulis (Philip Martin Brown) reveals that he saw the events, he gives a witness statement stating that Harriet pushed Aaron down the flight of stairs. She threatens Marvin to keep quiet, which is overseen by Valerie Pitman (Sarah Moyle); Valerie also gives a statement against Harriet. She is arrested and apologises to Rob, telling him that if not for the assault, she believes that the pair could have become romantic. After the scenes had aired, Stenson confirmed that her tenure on Doctors had come to an end due to being heavily pregnant whilst filming the scenes.

Jan Fisher

Jan Fisher, portrayed by Lucy Benjamin, first appeared on 24 May 2021 in the episode "Three Consultations and a Funeral". Cast member Sarah Moyle recommended Benjamin for the role of Jan to producers. Benjamin's casting as Jan was announced a week prior to the airing of the episode by What to Watch journalist Alison Slade. Referring to her history of appearing on fellow BBC soap opera EastEnders as Lisa Fowler, Slade wrote that Benjamin had swapped "Walford for Letherbridge". Slade also revealed that it would be a self-contained standalone episode. Benjamin stated that she loved playing Jan for the episode and noted her enjoyment at getting to star alongside Dido Miles in the two-hander. She added that Miles was an amazing actress to work with. The three consultations Dr. Emma Reid (Miles) has with Jan that are shown in the episode are set over the timeframe of a month.

Jan has her first appointment with Emma where she tells Emma that she cannot sleep. Emma asks if she is stressed, but she is interrupted by Jan's husband Mark calling her. He demands to know where she is and apologises for being away from him. Emma asks about the phone call and Jan explains that they have just argued but takes the blame for their argument. Emma asks Jan questions about her life to get a clear idea about her inability to sleep, and when Emma asks if Jan is depressed, she avoids the question. Mark phones again and Jan lies about her whereabouts. Emma questions why she lied to Mark, and she reveals that Mark is having affairs, chooses her outfits and tracks her location, but she does not want to lose their relationship. Jan then demands sleeping pills, but Emma feels that they would not solve her problems. Weeks later, Jan arrives at Emma's office with an injury on her face, having been thrown out by Mark. She explains that she was trying to buy sleeping pills on his laptop and found his affair with a colleague, to which she confronted him. Jan recalls an earlier situation where Mark disappeared for a week, leaving her without money and food, and told her that he would only return if she stopped accusing him of having affairs and stopped interrupting him.

Jan explains to Emma that he has a high sex drive and has forced her to have sex with him, as well as having casual sex with numerous young women. Emma asks Jan a series of questions to get Jan to realise that she is a victim of domestic abuse, but she leaves after being offended by Emma's assumptions. Their third and final consultation is at the police station, where Emma works as a force medical examiner. Jan asks Emma if Mark knows of her whereabouts, but Emma reminds her that Mark is dead and that Jan has been arrested under suspicion of murdering him. She recalls to Emma that Mark demanded that she stays in the house for a month, but wanted to cook him a special dinner for their anniversary. He threw the dinner at her and forced her to pick it up, taunting her, and Jan attacked Mark with a carving knife. Emma tells Jan about her friend who was a victim of coercive control which leads Jan to realise that Mark abused her for 32 years.

"Three Consultations and a Funeral" won the RTS Midland Award in the Scripted category, as well as Benjamin winning the Acting Performance accolade for portraying Jan in the episode. The award marked Benjamin's first award in her 43-year-long career in the acting industry. The episode also won the award for Best Single Episode at the 2022 British Soap Awards. Following the win, the BBC transmitted a special repeat of the episode and confirmed that a follow-up episode featuring Jan's court trial was in production. The episode. "The Trials of Jan Fisher", aired in September 2022. Benjamin was pleased to be asked back to Doctors since she felt a responsibility to show the public what had happened to Jan, as well as being excited to work with the crew again. She revealed to magazines that the episodes would cover two separate trials; one which goes badly for Jan compared to a second and more favourable trial. As part of a toxic relationship storyline Benjamin did for EastEnders, she had visited women's refuges. She used the experiences and stories to aid her portrayal of Jan. She hoped that the ending would show the public and people in similar situations that there can be a positive ending to domestic abuse cases.

Makeda Sylvester

Makeda Sylvester, portrayed by Angela Wynter, first appeared on 29 September 2021 and made her final appearance on 1 December 2021. Makeda was introduced as the mother of established character Bear Sylvester (Dex Lee). She has owned a Caribbean café since moving to Letherbridge but Bear suspects that there is an issue with the café. She explains to Bear that Clive Hopper (Jim Findley) has opened a rival Caribbean café in the area and that he has taken the majority of her customers. Bear gives her the idea of getting a mystery shopper to trial Clive's café and inform Makeda on what he is doing better than her, to which she asks Bear to perform the trial. Afterwards, Bear devises a plan to run Makeda's café as a mobile business. Makeda tells him that due to her age, she does not want to begin a new business venture and then announces her decision to move to France with Clive, with whom she has formed a romantic connection with. Whilst packing up the café, Makeda begins to suffer from fatigue and experiences pain. Bear sees her in pain and asks her to see a doctor, but Makeda refuses due to her previous doctor having retired and not wanting to see a new doctor due to the treatment of Black women by medical professionals.

Bear persuades Makeda to see his colleague, Zara Carmichael (Elisabeth Dermot Walsh), who he promises Makeda will treat her well. Zara informs Makeda that she needs a sigmoidoscopy and refers her to St Phils Hospital for the procedure. Once there, Bear has to leave to take care of a task at the Mill. Makeda is seen by nurse Cathy Jenkins (Laura Bayston), who continuously mispronounces her name and speaks to her with an unkind attitude. Makeda stands up for herself and corrects Cathy on the pronunciation of her name. Cathy responds with a racist attitude and Makeda refuses to be treated by her; the lack of treatment results in Makeda collapsing and going into a coma. After the loss of her café, Makeda moves to France to live with Bear's sister, Juliet.

At the 2022 British Soap Awards, Makeda's experiences with racism at St. Phils Hospital was nominated for Best Storyline.

Chelle Henry

Chelle Henry, portrayed by Kevwe Emefe, first appeared on 6 December 2021 and made her final appearance on 17 February 2022. Emefe announced her casting on Doctors via Instagram on 5 December 2021, the day before her first appearance. She confirmed that Chelle would be a recurring character and that she would be appearing in Doctors "over the next few months". Chelle is introduced as a pregnant patient of Ruhma Carter's (Bharti Patel); she is called in for a checkup having missed numerous appointments. Ruhma questions her absences and Chelle says that she thought she only had to see a midwife if there was a problem. Ruhma arranges standard tests for Chelle, but before she can be tested, she receives a call from a local baby boutique, telling her that an item she wants has come into stock. She leaves the hospital to buy it, and when delivery driver Andy Moore (Dan Hagley) delivers it, she affirms that she will carry it, but he refuses to let her.

While leaving the boutique, Chelle gets Braxton Hicks contractions and is rushed into hospital. Ruhma questions the amount she is buying for the baby and Chelle explains that she wants to provide for her forthcoming baby, even if she goes without. Ruhma explains that due to Chelle growing up in care, she can apply for a bursary for her baby, but Chelle takes offence and leaves, leaving a bag behind. Ruhma delivers the bag to her and sees how empty her house is; excluding the baby's room, which is fully furnished and decorated. Ruhma invites Chelle to a walk in the park for new mothers. Whilst on the walk, Maria Thimbley (Michelle Connolly) suggests several patronising mothering tips to Chelle for her baby, Leon. Initially beginning as a dislike, Chelle eventually "resents" Maria and their disagreements "get out of hand" when they argue.

Other characters

References

Doctors
2021
, Doctors